Boehmeria platyphylla is a species of false nettle in the family Urticaceae. It is found in Nepal.

References

Flora of Nepal
platyphylla